Bernard S. Flint (born January 15, 1940, in New Orleans, Louisiana) is a former New Orleans Police Department detective turned Thoroughbred racehorse trainer who won his 3,500th race on September 13, 2019, at Indiana Grand Race Track.

A graduate of Loyola University and the New Orleans Police Academy, Bernard Flint trained horses on a part-time basis from 1969 until 1976 when he retired from the police force.

His son Steven is also a trainer in Throughbred racing.

References

1940 births
Living people
American racehorse trainers
American police detectives
New Orleans Police Department officers
Loyola University New Orleans alumni
Sportspeople from New Orleans